The following are all matches played by the Mauritius national football team from 2010-2019.

Key

2010

2011

2012

2013

2014

2016

2017

2018

2019

References

2010s in Mauritius
2010-2019
2010 in Mauritian football
2011 in Mauritian football
2012 in Mauritian football
2013 in Mauritian football
2014 in Mauritian football